The 2016 Conference USA men's soccer season was the 22nd season of men's varsity soccer in the conference.

The FIU Panthers are both the defending conference tournament champions. The Kentucky Wildcats are the defending regular season champions.

Changes from 2015 

 None

Teams

Stadiums and locations 

 Louisiana Tech, Middle Tennessee State, North Texas, Rice, Southern Miss, UTEP, UTSA and WKU do not sponsor men's soccer. Kentucky, New Mexico and South Carolina are associated members.

Regular season

Results

Rankings

Postseason

CUSA tournament

New Mexico won their first Conference USA tournament, defeating the defending champions, FIU in the final.

NCAA tournament

All-CUSA awards and teams

See also 
 2016 NCAA Division I men's soccer season
 2016 Conference USA Men's Soccer Tournament
 2016 Conference USA women's soccer season

References 

 
2016 NCAA Division I men's soccer season